Giovanni Maria Vian (born March 10, 1952) is an Italian professor of patristic philology and a journalist. Vian was born in Rome. He was the editor-in-chief of L'Osservatore Romano from 2007 to 2018.

Editorial positions
As director of L'Osservatore, he had to face controversy over whether the paper was giving unwarranted support to the Barack Obama administration.

References

1952 births
Living people
Writers from Rome
Italian journalists
Italian male journalists
Italian philologists
Place of birth missing (living people)
L'Osservatore Romano editors